The 2018 European Junior & U23 Weightlifting Championships took place in OSiR Zamość, Zamość, Poland from 20 October to 27 October 2018.

Team ranking

Medal overview

Juniors

Men

Women

Under-23

Men

Women

Medal table
Ranking by Big (Total result) medals
 

Ranking by all medals: Big (Total result) and Small (Snatch and Clean & Jerk)

Points

Juniors

Under-23

Participating nations

References

External links
Start Book
Junior Results Book 
U23 Results Book

European Junior & U23 Weightlifting Championships
International sports competitions hosted by Poland
2018 in weightlifting
2018 in Polish sport
Weightlifting in Poland
October 2018 sports events in Poland